Mount Elliot is a locality in the City of Townsville, Queensland, Australia. It contains the mountain of the same name.

Geography 
The locality contains the mountain Mount Elliot which rises to a peak of 1220 metres above sea level, with the surrounding localities at 50–100 metres above sea level. The entire locality forms part of the Bowling Green Bay National Park with the Alligator Creek and its waterfall being within the Mount Elliot part of the park.

The Bruce Highway and the North Coast railway line form the northern boundary of the locality. The former Clevedon railway station was on the railway line in that area and the northern part of Mount Elliot is still known as Clevedon.

Mount Elliot is a watershed with the northern and western parts of the mountain draining into the Ross River which enters the Coral Sea at Townsville City and the southern and eastern parts of the mountain draining into the Haughton River which enters the Coral Sea near Giru.

History 
The mountain was most likely named by Thomas Stewart, captain of the merchant ship, Lady Elliot, which sailed from Calcutta to Sydney in 1815-1816. It is believed the ship was named after the wife of Hugh Elliot, Privy Counsellor, and Governor of Madras from 1814 to 1820.

From 1846 until 1863, shipwreck survivor James Morrill lived with the Aboriginal clan whose country was Mount Elliot and the surrounding area.

References

External links 

City of Townsville
Localities in Queensland